Salter's duck, also known as the nodding duck or by its official name the Edinburgh duck, is a device that converts wave power into electricity. The wave impact induces rotation of gyroscopes located inside a pear-shaped "duck", and an electrical generator converts this rotation into electricity with an overall efficiency of up to 90%. The Salter's duck was invented by Stephen Salter in response to the oil shortage in the 1970s and was one of the earliest generator designs proposed to the Wave Energy programme in the United Kingdom. The funding for the project was cut off in the early 1980s after oil prices rebounded and the UK government moved away from alternative energy sources. As of May 2018 no wave-power devices have ever gone into large-scale production.

History
As a result of the 1973 oil crisis, Salter set about creating a source of alternative energy. The idea for creating Salter's duck came about from his studies on a lavatory cistern while at the University of Edinburgh. He invented Salter's duck in 1974 and attempted to make it the main device of choice for the Wave Energy programme in the United Kingdom. A prototype attempt to use the device was constructed in 1976 off Dores Beach. It was to be used to "provide some 20 kW of power". It was modified slightly from the original design, and Coventry University, which helped with the design, went on to utilize a separate type that was called the Sea Clam.

Due to the 1980s oil glut, the perceived need for immediate alternative energy sources subsequently declined, and in 1982 the Wave Energy programme was shut down, ending the hope of Salter's duck becoming a mainstay in the alternative energy campaign. After later investigation, it was discovered that the Energy Technology Support Unit's cost determinations had mis-estimated the cost of building Salter's duck by more than double the actual cost. The Energy Technology Support Unit was set up in 1974 as an agency on behalf of the Department of Energy; though its function was to manage research programmes on renewable energy and energy conservation, it was operated by the United Kingdom Atomic Energy Authority. Cost considerations based on the findings were among the main factors in the ducks not being put into widespread production under the Wave Energy programme in the late 1970s. The other major factor was that a consulting firm tasked with distributing government grants passed over the 9.5 million pounds that had been allocated to Salter's research and the improvement of Salter's duck, so the funds were never actually granted to Salter and his group. From this revelation and with the increase in research into alternative energy in the 2000s, Salter's duck has begun to be used as a part of wave energy research in the United Kingdom.

Design
The original prototype of Salter's duck was made of "a string of floating vanes of rudimentary duck cross-sections linked through a central spine". The string itself had 12 ducks attached to it that were "50 cm wide mounted on a spine 27 cm in diameter and 6 m long." It was made at Coventry University, with materials from Ready Made Concrete and Insituform. The final design worked by having 20 to 30 ducks connected together by the jointed spine, with each duck moving with the waves that hit it and transferring the energy of the impact to "six to ten pumps" for each duck. The pear shape of the ducks have them facing the waves due to the decided orientation of their spine so that they rock and turn over when a wave hits them. This causes four gyroscopes inside to move back and forth, creating hydraulic energy that is transferred to a turbine or generator.

Energy efficiency
In order to determine the efficiency of energy output from Salter's duck, in 1975, scientist Swift-Hook and others ran a series of tests. The optimum range of the ducks was determined according to the formula,

The use of a lowercase r in this formula indicates the back radius of the ducks. They also had to test for the incidence energy (R) given off by a submerged surface (s), the formula of which is,

In this formula, the v stands for body velocity and the u for unperturbed fluid velocity perpendicular to the surface. With this, they were able to then use the final formula that tested for the absorption efficiency, eta (n),

The use of these three formulas allowed Swift-Hook to determine that Salter's duck is able to convert "90% of the wave energy into mechanical energy". However, this percentage was lower when the duck was tested in a laboratory. In varying types of realistic conditions, the efficiency of the duck varies wildly and often drops to around 50%, as ducks are more often used in rough weather in order to convert enough wave power. Conversely, ducks are not useful in calm weather, as the waves would not have enough energy for there to be any efficiency in converting it.

References

Wave energy converters